Frederick Charles Moir (around 1870) was an Anglican priest.

Educated at Selwyn College, Cambridge (1893), his first post was as a curate at St Peter, Glasgow. After this he was the incumbent at St John, Dumfries and then Provost of St Paul's Cathedral, Dundee, a post he held from 1907 until 1920. Later he held posts at St Columba, Largs and St John Aberdeen before retiring in 1940. The 1947-48 Crockford's Clerical Directory states that he had permission to officiate in the Diocese of Moray, Ross and Caithness.

References

Alumni of Selwyn College, Cambridge
Scottish Episcopalian clergy
Provosts of St Paul's Cathedral, Dundee